Southern Rovers were a British motorcycle speedway team between 1956 and 1959. They were the champions of the Southern Area League during 1957. The team were unique to speedway at the time because they completed a league season despite having no home stadium to ride from.

History
The team were created in 1956 following the demise of Brafield Flying Foxes. The Southern Area League was faced with a serious problem in that only three teams would have lined up for the season, therefore the promoters got together and encouraged the formation of a team that would race at the three venues of the other league teams. Home fixtures for Southern Rovers would not be held at the team's stadium that they were riding against but away fixtures would. Rovers' team manager Les King also lost the services of their rider Vic Hall (formerly of Brafield) to injury. Therefore the team did extremely well to finish third in the table and were assisted by the consistent riding of Eric Hockaday, Colin Goddy and Eric Eadon.

The following season they were based at the home of Rayleigh Rockets at the Rayleigh Weir Stadium, which led to some match reports as the team being called Rayleigh II. The experience of riding away must have helped as Southern Rovers won the title the following season (1957 Southern Area League). Five players made the top ten league averages for the season; Colin Goddy, Leo McAuliffe, Stan Clark, Brian Meredith and Vic Hall.

During the 1959 Southern Area League season the team withdrew after one fixture and had their results expunged.

Season summary

References

Defunct British speedway teams